Astylopsis arcuata is a species of longhorn beetle of the subfamily Lamiinae. It was described by John Lawrence LeConte in 1878.

References

Beetles described in 1878
Acanthocinini